Lac-des-Eaux-Mortes (literally Lake of the dead Waters) is an unorganized territory in the Canadian province of Quebec, located in the La Mitis Regional County Municipality.

See also
 Patapédia River
 East Patapédia River
 La Mitis Regional County Municipality
 List of unorganized territories in Quebec

References

Unorganized territories in Bas-Saint-Laurent